Edward Moore Kennedy Jr. (born September 26, 1961) is an American lawyer and politician.  He is a partner at Epstein Becker & Green, a firm headquartered in New York City, and previously represented Connecticut's 12th State Senate district in the Connecticut State Senate from 2015 to 2019.
He is a son of Senator Edward M. "Ted" Kennedy from Massachusetts and nephew of President John F. Kennedy and Senator Robert F. Kennedy.

Early life and education
Edward Moore Kennedy Jr. was born in St. Elizabeth's Hospital in the Brighton section of Boston, Massachusetts to Ted Kennedy Sr.  and Joan Bennett Kennedy during the presidency of his paternal uncle John. He is the brother of Kara (19602011) and Patrick J. Kennedy (born 1967).

In 1973, when Kennedy was twelve, osteosarcoma (a form of bone cancer) was diagnosed in his right leg. The leg was surgically amputated on November 17, 1973. On that same day, his father had escorted his niece Kathleen down the aisle at her wedding and rushed back to the hospital. A made-for-TV movie, The Ted Kennedy Jr. Story (1986), concentrated on this event in young Kennedy's life.

In 1982, his mother Joan revealed that Kennedy missed by just ten minutes being aboard Air Florida Flight 90, which crashed into the Potomac River on January 13 of that year, killing 74 people. Kennedy was delayed on the drive to the airport and missed the flight.

Kennedy graduated from the private St. Albans School, in Washington, D.C.  After completing a Bachelor of Arts degree at Wesleyan University, in Middletown, Connecticut, in 1984, he continued his studies at Yale University, in New Haven, Connecticut, earning a master's degree from the School of Forestry and Environmental Studies.  He then attended the University of Connecticut School of Law at night, earning a Juris Doctor degree. On May 19, 2013, Kennedy received an honorary Doctor of Laws degree from the University of New Haven.

Career
After graduation he worked at the New Haven law firm Wiggin & Dana specializing in disability issues. He later co-founded and served as president of the Marwood Group, a firm that advises corporations about health care and financial services. He left the Marwood Group in 2014 to join the law firm of Epstein Becker & Green where he advises health care providers, commercial insurers, and life science companies on critical issues related to health care reform policies.

Kennedy is the Chairman of the board of directors of the American Association of People with Disabilities.

Political career
On April 8, 2014, Kennedy announced his candidacy for a seat in the Connecticut State Senate representing the state's 12th district. He was elected on November 4. He was re-elected on November 8, 2016. In both election cycles, Kennedy defeated Bruce Wilson Jr.

On June 26, 2017, Kennedy announced that he would not run for Governor of Connecticut in 2018. On February 28, 2018, Kennedy announced he would not seek re-election to the Connecticut State Senate. On November 6, 2018, Democrat Christine Cohen won the general election to replace Kennedy after defeating Republican Adam Greenberg.  She was later sworn in on January 9, 2019.

State Senate
Kennedy was first sworn in to serve in the Connecticut State Senate on January 7, 2015.

Committee assignments
 Committee on the Environment (Senate Co-chair)
 Committee on Internship (Ranking Member)
 Committee on Public Health
 Committee on Transportation
Party leadership
 Deputy Majority Leader

Personal life

On October 10, 1993, Kennedy married Katherine Anne "Kiki" Gershman (b. 1959) on Block Island, Rhode Island. She is an assistant clinical professor of psychiatry at the Yale School of Medicine at Yale University and an environmental advocate. She serves as spokeswoman for Stop the Pipeline, which successfully blocked the Islander East natural gas pipeline across the Long Island Sound. They live in Branford, Connecticut.

The couple have a daughter, Kiley Rose Kennedy (born August 7, 1994, in New Haven), a competitive snowboarder who graduated from Wesleyan University in 2016, and a son, Edward Moore Kennedy III, (born February 26, 1998, in New Haven) who graduated from Choate Rosemary Hall in 2016 and from Wesleyan University in 2020.  

Kennedy gave a tribute to his father at his father's public funeral on August 29, 2009.

See also
 Kennedy family
 Kennedy Curse

References

External links 

marwoodgroup.com, Marwood Group official website

 (Boston, Massachusetts)
Connecticut Senate page

1961 births
American amputees
American people of Irish descent
American politicians with disabilities
Businesspeople from New York (state)
Connecticut lawyers
Democratic Party Connecticut state senators
Edward Moore
Ted Kennedy
Living people
Politicians from Boston
Lawyers from New Haven, Connecticut
St. Albans School (Washington, D.C.) alumni
University of Connecticut School of Law alumni
Wesleyan University alumni
Yale School of Forestry & Environmental Studies alumni
Lawyers from Boston
21st-century American politicians
Politicians from New Haven, Connecticut